The Esperanza Peace and Justice Center was founded in 1987 and was mostly made up of Chicana activists. They are an activist group looking to unite the world and San Antonio on its issues concerning diversity and spread peace around the world. During its early years, they were active and voiced out against the KKK, they used mural projects that engaged art skills at a young age, and they focused on including the Queer community with an Art Exhibit in Texas. The Esperanza Peace and Justice Center continues to be an outspoken force to this day who advocates for peace and justice.

Early years 
In its early years, the movement was brought up mostly by queer Chicana activist who were looking to unite peace movements not only in San Antonio, but in the Texas. the executive director Susan Guerra worked out of a building at North Flores Street in San Antonio. Not long after, in 1988, Graciela Sanchez became executive director after returning from film school in Cuba and she holds the position to this day. Sanchez, who is Yale-educated, had worked at civil rights organizations and had thoughts of being an attorney before eventually finding herself becoming executive director for the Esperanza Peace and Justice Center in San Antonio. Sanchez had “wanted to focus on issues that weren’t male-centered.”

Graciela Sanchez and The Esperanza Peace and Justice Center had rough times, particularly at the beginning. They were one of few who addressed the LGBTQ community and its issues, and for that reason they were looked down upon in many places. Graciela notes that they “suffered for it,” often times being kicked out of buildings and defunded by the city. They would later win a lawsuit against the city. A lot of Graciela’s fighting spirit is attributed to her family and their involvement in activism. Sanchez’s mother, Isabel, was well known for her advocation for children on the West Side and often she “held people accountable and spoke her mind.” Also, Graciela’s grandmother had a history of activism, going door-to-door asking neighbors to sign petitions for the city to provide electricity. Sanchez has felt the effects of this kind of work though, saying “The work at Esperanza has caused a lot of attacks towards [me] personally.” But she has also noted the effects and impact that she has seen growing on a lot of young Mexican American children.

Mission 
The goal of the Esperanza Peace and Justice Center is to be there for women who have suffered through inequality due to their race, who they are attracted to, sexuality, gender or working class. Their aim is to create bonds between each other by educating and uplifting one another. It is spearheaded by mostly Latinas and most being lesbian. It is an organization that is feminists, politically progressive and generally outspoken for women. Art and cultural programs are used to spread their messages and bring together different and diverse communities.

MujerArtes Studio 
Also known as MujerArtes Casita, it is a gallery which attracts thousands of visitors every year. They hold occasions such as school/art fairs and libraries. They also host events such as The Peace Market, Día de los Muertos, Mother’s Day, Día de la Virgin and more.

Founded in 1995, the women mold clay into historic events of their lives as workers and their history as marginalized people in their environment.

Rinconcito de Esperanza   
Translated to The Corner of Hope, it is the center of the movement and has grown since its first purchase, which was Casa de Cuentos, in 2002. It was opened by Emilia Sanchez to those in need of food and shelter, today it is used as a multipurpose venue.

Ruben’s Ice House was established in 2007 and was a prominent gathering place and now renovations are being made.

Casita, which was built in the 1920s, and was purchased in 2009, is mainly used for guest quarters and is going through renovations.

Personnel 
Graciela Sanchez is the director of the Esperanza and has been since 1988. She was brought up in s household of women with strong, independent voices who also were into activism. Graciela and her staff work to create plans and programs that aid people of color, queer people and women, and people who survived cultural genocide. She helps spark up many uncomfortable conversations about race, sexuality, income, etc. She works with members on her staff and of the community to create programs like CineMujer, Uprooted: Tierra, Gente, y Cultura, Palestinians and other Occupied Peoples, and this list includes much more.

Amelia Valdez is the Buena Gente Coordinator. She was born in San Antonio and graduated from the University of Michigan in 1989. She then started her career as the Director of Education for the Boys & Girls club of San Antonio, also being apart of staff and policy development. She was able to get funds for youth programs, even receiving recognition for her youth development. After her work at the Boys & Girls club, she then worked as a program specialist at the Girl Scouts of Southwest Texas and had a huge role in serving more girls in the inner city.

Kayla Miranda is a housing justice advocate in the westside of San Antonio.

Susana Segura has been working with the Westside community since the founding of the Esperanza Peace and Justice Center in 1988. Her job title is the coordinator for the Arte es Vida Project Coordinator and also Barrio Historian. She has worked with social service agencies, labor organizations, health awareness services and cultural arts groups. Currently, she is working with the Esperanza to restore Lerma’s Nite Club, the longest running live conjunto music venue in the U.S. She is also involved with social, economic and environmental struggles around people of color, working class and LGBTQ community campaigns.

References 

 "Rinconcito de Esperanza". Esperanza Peace and Justice Center. .
 "MujerArtes Clay Cooperative". sacrd.org.
 Degollado, Jessie (2021-10-11). "Yale-educated Graciela Sanchez has family legacy of activism"
 "Oral history interview with Graciela Sanchez, 2004 June 25-July 2 | Archives of American Art, Smithsonian Institution". www.aaa.si.edu.
 "Graciela Sánchez". We Are ILI.

Wikipedia Student Program
Chicano
Mexican-American organizations
Mexican-American culture in San Antonio